19th Battalion was a battalion in the Fleet Marine Corps Reserve based in Augusta, Georgia.

Subordinate units
 Headquarters Company
 Company A
 Company B
 Company C

History
The battalion was formed in December 1936 and was mobilized 7 November 1940 for service in anticipation of World War II. Upon mobilization, the Marines were sent to various assignments throughout the Marine Corps as was customary for the time. The battalion was subsequently disbanded after mobilization.

Notable former members
Aquilla James Dyess

Notes

External links

Augusta, Georgia
Battalions of the United States Marine Corps
Military units and formations in Georgia (U.S. state)
Military units and formations of the United States Marine Corps Reserve
1936 establishments in Georgia (U.S. state)